John Brimacombe (born 12 July 1953) is a former Australian rules footballer who played for Geelong in the Victorian Football League (now known as the Australian Football League).

References 

1953 births
Living people
Geelong Football Club players
Sandy Bay Football Club players
Australian rules footballers from Tasmania